Nawab Mian Mushtaq Ahmed Gurmani ((1905 – 1981) was a Pakistani politician who served as the Diwan of the Bahawalpur State. He was from Sinanwan. After the partition of India and the accession of Bahawalpur, he served as a 'Minister without Portfolio' in the central Government of Pakistan in charge of the Ministry of Kashmir Affairs.

Early life 
Mian Mushtaq Ahmad Gurmani was born in a Gurmani family of village Thatha Gurmani, Tehsil Kot Addu, District Muzaffargarh, in the Punjab Province of Pakistan.

Career 
In his role as 'Minister without Portfolio'  but in charge of Kashmir Affairs, he signed the Karachi Agreement of 1949 that established a ceasefire line between Pakistani and Indian areas of Kashmir, which later became known as the Line of Control. In 1951, he served as the  Executive for Kashmir Affairs and Northern Areas and also served as Interior Minister of Pakistan from 1951 till 1954.

Between 1954 and 1957 he served as Governor of Punjab. In 1955, the post of Punjab Governor was abolished and Gurmani went on to become the first Governor of West Pakistan. Mushtaq Ahmed Gurmani belonged to the Gurmani  Baloch tribe. After his death his family made a foundation called Gurmani Foundation which gave huge amount of one billion rupees in LUMS University Lahore for the establishment of new department named as Mushtaq Ahmed Gurmani school of humanities and social sciences.

Books

By him
Kashmir, a survey, 1951.
Agricultural crisis in Pakistan, speeches, 1957.

About him
Nawab Mian Mushtaq Ahmad Gurmani: some personal traits and leadership by S. Qalb-i-Abid, 2017.

References

1905 births
1981 deaths
Interior ministers of Pakistan
Governors of Punjab, Pakistan
Governors of West Pakistan
Pakistani sports executives and administrators
Pakistan Hockey Federation presidents
Baloch people
Prime Ministers of Bahawalpur (princely state)
People from Muzaffargarh
Politicians from Muzaffargarh